The Big Badass is the second studio album by the American rapper and producer Ant Banks.

It peaked at No. 80 on the Billboard 200.

Track listing 
 "The Big Badass" 5:30
 "2 Kill A G" (featuring Spice 1 and Too Short) 5:20
 "Streets of Oakland" (featuring Boots Riley of The Coup) 4:39
 "The Drunken Fool" (featuring Otis & Shug) 4:13
 "Parlayin'" (featuring Goldy) 4:12
 "Clownin' Wit Da Crew" (featuring The Dangerous Crew) 3:42
 "Fuckin' Wit Banks" (featuring Too Short and Goldy) 4:54
 "Straight Hustlin'" 4:29
 "Pimp Style Gangstas" (featuring Rappin' Ron and Ant Diddley Dog) 3:48
 "The Loot" (featuring Too Short) 3:28
 "Packin' A Gat" 5:19
 "Hard As Hell" 5:30

Samples
Clownin' Wit Da Crew
"Go Fer Yer Funk" by P-Funk All Stars
Packin' a Gat
"Eazy-Duz-It" by Eazy-E
Parlayin'
"F-Encounter" by Bootsy Collins
Straight Hustlin'
"Children of Productions" by Parliament
The Drunken Fool
"A House Full of Girls" by Isaac Hayes
The Loot
"Chocolate City" by Parliament

Chart positions

References 

Ant Banks albums
1994 albums
Albums produced by Ant Banks
Jive Records albums